The spangled drongo (Dicrurus bracteatus) is a bird of the family Dicruridae. It is the only drongo to be found in Australia, where it can be recognised by its black, iridescent plumage and its characteristic forked tail. It feeds on insects and small vertebrates. It has complex and varied calls and is a mimic of the sounds it hears. It arrives in Queensland in late spring and breeds high in an isolated tree, producing three to five young each year.

Description
Its basically black plumage is iridescent with blue and purple highlights. Its eyes are crimson.
The most remarkable characteristic of its appearance is its tail, which is described by Morcombe as "long, outcurved and forked" and on first examination looks like its feathers are crossed over – like crossing your fingers. Young drongos lack the highlights and spots and their eyes are dark brown.

Behaviour

The spangled drongo displays uninhibited and sometimes comical behaviour as it swoops and perches in search of insects, small birds, and occasionally, small skinks.  When it seasonally visits urban areas, it is easily tamed by throwing small pieces of raw meat into the air, when it will accurately swoop and catch them midair.

Whilst this bird is often silent, it sometimes makes astonishingly loud, complex, and entertaining calls that may sound like a "sneeze". The spangled drongo is an amazing mimic, taking most of its vocabulary from the sounds heard in the vicinity and weaving them into a song.

The spangled drongo is the only drongo to be found in Australia. These birds are altitudinal and latitudinal migrants, and in the high-altitude areas around Brisbane in Queensland, they arrive in late spring and leave with their new crop of juveniles in midsummer. Nests are cup-shaped in open spaces, where predators have difficulty accessing them without being seen, 75% up the canopy. Each year, they produce three to five young.

Trivia
The unsuccessful racehorse Drongo was named after the bird, which led to the Australian slang insult "drongo" meaning "idiot".

Notes

References

External links

Australian Museum fact sheet

spangled drongo
Birds of Australia
Birds of the Maluku Islands
Birds of New Guinea
Birds of the Philippines
spangled drongo